Samuel António da Silva Tavares Quina (born 3 August 1966), known simply as Samuel, is a Portuguese retired footballer.

Having played mostly for Benfica in the late 1980s and early 1990s, he operated mainly as a central defender.

Club career
Samuel was born in Bissau, Portuguese Guinea. A product of S.L. Benfica's youth ranks, he made his debut with the first team on 30 December 1983 (aged 17) after being brought on as a substitute by manager Sven-Göran Eriksson in a 4–0 home win over G.D. Chaves for the Portuguese Cup. His first goal came in a 2–2 away draw against S.C. Braga, and he went on to have a somewhat important role in the Lisbon club during seven seasons.

Samuel started in the 1990 European Cup final, a 0–1 loss against A.C. Milan, pitching in at left back on the occasion. His last game was in a 1–0 victory at Louletano D.C. on 29 November 1992, and he went on to represent Boavista FC – he returned one season to Benfica, but was released at its closure – Vitória de Guimarães, F.C. Tirsense, Odivelas F.C. and S.L. Fanhões.

International career
Samuel earned five caps for the Portugal national team, over the course of nine months. His debut was on 4 September 1991, in a 1–1 friendly draw with Austria in Porto.

Personal life
Samuel's son, Domingos, represented Portugal at youth level and played professionally for West Ham United and Watford.

Honours
Benfica
Primeira Liga: 1986–87, 1988–89, 1990–91
Taça de Portugal: 1984–85, 1985–86, 1986–87, 1992–93
Supertaça Cândido de Oliveira: 1985, 1989
European Cup runner-up: 1987–88, 1989–90

Boavista
Taça de Portugal: 1991–92

References

External links

National team data 

1966 births
Living people
Sportspeople from Bissau
Portuguese footballers
Portugal international footballers
Portugal youth international footballers
Portugal under-21 international footballers
Bissau-Guinean footballers
Bissau-Guinean emigrants to Portugal
Association football defenders
Primeira Liga players
Segunda Divisão players
S.L. Benfica footballers
Boavista F.C. players
Vitória S.C. players
F.C. Tirsense players
Odivelas F.C. players